Budi may refer to:

People
 Budi Anduk (1968–2016), Indonesian actor
 Budi Darma (1932–2021), Indonesian writer
 Budi Gunawan (born 1959), Indonesian police officer
 Budi Putra (born 1972), Indonesian journalist
 Budi Sudarsono (born 1979), Indonesian footballer
 Budi Karya Sumadi (born 1956), Indonesian architect
 Robert Budi Hartono (born 1940), Chinese Indonesian tobacco billionaire

Other
 Budi County, a region in Eastern Equatoria State, South Sudan
 Budi Lake near the coast of Araucanía Region, southern Chile
 Pjetër Budi (1566 – 1622), a bishop of Sapë and the author of four religious works in Albanian 
 Budi (philosophy), an Indonesian concept akin to ethical or moral reason 
 Budiš, a village and municipality in Turčianske Teplice District in the Žilina Region of northern central Slovakia
 Budhwar, a clan or gotra of Jats found in Uttar Pradesh and Haryana in India
Budi, Thailand

Masculine given names
Indonesian masculine given names
Indonesian given names